In mathematics, particularly in operator theory, Wold decomposition or Wold–von Neumann decomposition, named after Herman Wold and John von Neumann, is a classification theorem for isometric linear operators on a given Hilbert space. It states that every isometry is a direct sum of copies of the unilateral shift and a unitary operator.

In time series analysis, the theorem implies that any stationary discrete-time stochastic process can be decomposed into a pair of uncorrelated processes, one deterministic, and the other being a moving average process.

Details 

Let H be a Hilbert space, L(H) be the bounded operators on H, and V ∈ L(H) be an isometry. The Wold decomposition states that every isometry V takes the form

for some index set A, where S is the unilateral shift on a Hilbert space Hα, and U is a unitary operator (possible vacuous). The family {Hα} consists of isomorphic Hilbert spaces.

A proof can be sketched as follows. Successive applications of V give a descending sequences of copies of H isomorphically embedded in itself:

where V(H) denotes the range of V. The above defined Hi = Vi(H). If one defines

then

It is clear that K1 and K2 are invariant subspaces of V.

So V(K2) = K2. In other words, V restricted to K2 is a surjective isometry, i.e., a unitary operator U.

Furthermore, each Mi is isomorphic to another, with V being an isomorphism between Mi and Mi+1: V "shifts" Mi to Mi+1. Suppose the dimension of each Mi is some cardinal number α. We see  that K1 can be written as a direct sum Hilbert spaces

where each Hα is an invariant subspaces of V and V restricted to each Hα is the unilateral shift S. Therefore

which is a Wold decomposition of V.

Remarks 

It is immediate from the Wold decomposition that the spectrum of any proper, i.e. non-unitary, isometry is the unit disk in the complex plane.

An isometry V is said to be pure if, in the notation of the above proof, ∩i≥0 Hi = {0}. The multiplicity of a pure isometry V is the dimension of the kernel of V*, i.e. the cardinality of the index set A in the Wold decomposition of V. In other words, a pure isometry of multiplicity N takes the form

In this terminology, the Wold decomposition expresses an isometry as a direct sum of a pure isometry and a unitary operator.

A subspace M is called a wandering subspace of V if Vn(M) ⊥ Vm(M) for all n ≠ m. In particular, each Mi defined above is a wandering subspace of V.

A sequence of isometries 

The decomposition above can be generalized slightly to a sequence of isometries, indexed by the integers.

The C*-algebra generated by an isometry 

Consider an isometry V ∈ L(H). Denote by C*(V) the C*-algebra generated by V, i.e. C*(V) is the norm closure of polynomials in V and V*. The Wold decomposition can be applied to characterize C*(V).

Let C(T) be the continuous functions on the unit circle T. We recall that the C*-algebra C*(S) generated by the unilateral shift S takes the following form

C*(S) = {Tf + K | Tf is a Toeplitz operator with continuous symbol f ∈ C(T) and K is a compact operator}.

In this identification, S = Tz where z is the identity function in C(T). The algebra C*(S) is called the Toeplitz algebra.

Theorem (Coburn) C*(V) is isomorphic to the Toeplitz algebra and V is the isomorphic image of Tz.

The proof hinges on the connections with C(T), in the description of the Toeplitz algebra and that the spectrum of a unitary operator is contained in the circle T.

The following properties of the Toeplitz algebra will be needed:

The semicommutator  is compact.

The Wold decomposition says that V is the direct sum of copies of Tz and then some unitary U:

So we invoke the continuous functional calculus f → f(U), and define

One can now verify Φ is an isomorphism that maps the unilateral shift to V:

By property 1 above, Φ is linear. The map Φ is injective because Tf is not compact for any non-zero f ∈ C(T) and thus Tf + K = 0 implies f = 0. Since the range of Φ is a C*-algebra, Φ is surjective by the minimality of C*(V). Property 2 and the continuous functional calculus ensure that Φ preserves the *-operation. Finally, the semicommutator property shows that Φ is multiplicative. Therefore the theorem holds.

References 
 
 
 
 

Operator theory
Invariant subspaces
C*-algebras
Theorems in functional analysis

de:Shiftoperator#Wold-Zerlegung